Hyloxalus pulcherrimus is a moderately large species of poison dart frog endemic to Peru. It is only known to be found in two streams near Cutervo.

References

pulcherimmus